The Trustees of Reservations is a non-profit land conservation and historic preservation organization dedicated to preserving natural and historical places in the Commonwealth of Massachusetts. It is the oldest land conservation nonprofit organization of its kind in the world and has 140,000 dues-paying members . In addition to land stewardship, the organization is also active in conservation partnerships, community supported agriculture (CSA), environmental and conservation education, community preservation and development, and green building. Properties include historic mansions, estates, and gardens; woodland preserves; waterfalls; mountain peaks; wetlands and riverways; coastal bluffs, beaches, and barrier islands; farmland and CSA projects; and archaeological sites.

Main offices of the organization are located in Beverly, Leominster, and Sharon, Massachusetts. Financial support for the organization comes from membership dues, annual contributions, property admission fees, special events, grants, and endowments. In June 2006, The Trustees earned gold-level recognition from the United States Green Building Council for its Doyle Conservation Center in Leominster. In 2014, after seven years as an affiliate, the Boston Natural Areas Network merged with the Trustees of Reservations.

History

The Trustees of Reservations was proposed in 1890 when the New England periodical Garden and Forest published a letter by landscape architect Charles Eliot (protégé of Frederick Law Olmsted) entitled "The Waverly Oaks." Eliot's letter proposed the immediate preservation of "special bits of scenery" still remaining "within  of the State House which possess uncommon beauty and more than usual refreshing power." To this end, Eliot proposed that legislation be enacted to create a nonprofit corporation to hold land for the public to enjoy "just as a Public Library holds books and an Art Museum holds pictures."

In the spring of 1891, the Massachusetts Legislature established The Trustees of Public Reservations "for the purposes of acquiring, holding, maintaining and opening to the public beautiful and historic places within the Commonwealth."  The act was signed into law by Governor William E. Russell on May 21, 1891. The word "Public" was dropped from the organization's name in 1954 to avoid confusion with government-owned land.

Virginia Wood in Stoneham was the first property acquired by The Trustees. This property was conveyed to the Metropolitan District Commission in 1923 and is now a part of the Middlesex Fells Reservation. Waverly Oaks itself was also conveyed to the state by The Trustees and is part of the Beaver Brook Reservation, established in 1893.

In 1925, The Trustees joined with the Appalachian Mountain Club, Massachusetts Audubon Society, and the Society for the Preservation of New England Antiquities (now Historic New England) to organize a conference on "The Needs and Uses of Open Spaces." This conference led to a 1929 report emphasizing the need to protect the state's rural character and countryside and the importance of identifying and describing the qualities and characteristics of specific sites that should be preserved. Today, nearly every site listed in the report is protected by a government or nonprofit conservation agency.

Mission and initiatives

The mission statement of The Trustees of Reservations is to "preserve, for public use and enjoyment, properties of exceptional scenic, historic, and ecological value in Massachusetts." The Trustees of Reservations also supports a number of contingent initiatives.

Initiatives
The Putnam Conservation Institute, also known as the Conservation Common, offers workshops, conferences, and networking for "land conservationists, urban park advocates, historic preservationists, watershed associations, state agencies, municipal commissions," etc.

The Highland Communities Initiative is a cooperative effort of The Trustees and community members from small hilltowns in The Berkshires geography dedicated to preserving regional cultural and physical landscapes and enhancing the quality of life of local residents;

The Doyle Conservation Center is a green architecture initiative and regional office, conference, and education center located in Leominster, Massachusetts. The structure, designed by HKT Architects of Somerville, Massachusetts and landscape architects Hines Wasser & Associates, was registered for a Leadership in Energy and Environmental Design gold certification with the United States Green Building Council. The building includes "photovoltaic panels, high-efficiency lighting and controls, a displacement ventilation system, high performance windows, a high performance building envelope, geothermal wells and carbon dioxide monitoring systems;" it incorporates green materials such as desks made of sunflower seeds, bamboo and cork flooring, and recycled fiber carpet and paneling.

Collaborative conservation
Copicut Woods, Slocum's River Reserve, the Tully Trail, and Appleton Farms represent collaborative efforts of The Trustees of Reservations, government agencies, local communities, and private groups to create a bioreserve, a mixed use open space preserve, a  recreation trail, and a mixed use and community supported agriculture preserve, respectively. Copicut Woods is part of the cooperatively managed Southeastern Massachusetts Bioreserve which protects  of forest in Fall River, Freetown and Dartmouth, Massachusetts. Slocum's River Reserve is a cooperative effort by the state, The Trustees and the Dartmouth Natural Resources Trust and includes protected braken river frontage and farming conservation restrictions. The Tully Trail, of northern Worcester County, is a collaborative recreational project produced by The Trustees, the Mount Grace Land Conservation Trust, Harvard University's Harvard Forest, the National Park Service, the New England Forestry Foundation, state agencies, and the United States Army Corps of Engineers. Appleton Farms of Ipswich is a combination CSA project, retail feed and mulch haying operation, livestock and dairy program, recreation area, and ecological preservation area; it includes experiential education programs for adults and children.  Current conservation projects include cooperative efforts on the Mount Tom Range and interpretive development of the birthplace of suffragist Lucy Stone in West Brookfield, Massachusetts.

Properties

See List of properties managed by The Trustees of Reservations

The Trustees of Reservations owns and manages a broad range of properties across the state of Massachusetts. Many properties contain historic buildings, including nine historic house museums and two lighthouses open to the public. The Trustees manage five National Historic Landmarks, one National Natural Landmark, and several properties that are listed on the National Register of Historic Places. In addition, The Trustees of Reservations manages, per contract, the U.S. Army Corps of Engineers' Tully Lake Campground in Royalston; the Westport Town Farm in Westport; and Norton Point Beach in Edgartown, which is owned by the county government of Dukes County. The Trustees' properties spill over into both Connecticut and Vermont.

Notable properties include Bartholomew's Cobble of Sheffield, a National Natural Landmark containing North America's greatest diversity of fern species; Crane Beach and the Castle Hill mansion of Ipswich, a barrier beach and National Historic Landmark; Doane's Falls and Royalston Falls, popular waterfalls located in Royalston; Cape Poge Wildlife Refuge, a barrier island located on Martha's Vineyard; The Old Manse of Concord, made famous by transcendentalist writer Nathaniel Hawthorne; Naumkeag a gilded-age historic mansion and National Historic Landmark located in Stockbridge; World's End on Boston Harbor, a coastal peninsula park transformed from an unrealized Frederick Law Olmsted residential subdivision design; and Dinosaur Footprints, a rock face in Holyoke containing 134 footprints of Triassic dinosaur species. Moose Hill Farm in Sharon and Cormier Woods in Uxbridge are some of its most recent acquisitions.

See also

 Historic New England
 List of properties managed by The Trustees of Reservations
 Natural landscape
 National Trust for Historic Preservation

References

External links

 The Trustees of Reservations website

 
Land trusts in Massachusetts
Nature conservation organizations based in the United States
Historic preservation organizations in the United States
History of Massachusetts
Natural history of Massachusetts
Protected areas of Massachusetts
Organizations established in 1890
1890 establishments in Massachusetts